Castelbelforte is a comune (municipality) in the Province of Mantua in the Italian region Lombardy, located about  east of Milan and about  northeast of Mantua.

Castelbelforte borders the following municipalities: Bigarello, Erbè, Roverbella, San Giorgio di Mantova, Sorgà, Trevenzuolo.

Demographic evolution

References

Cities and towns in Lombardy